Khodeja Khatun (August 15, 1917 – February 3, 1990) was a Bangladeshi educationist, writer and social worker.

Education and career
In 1939, Khatun became the second Muslim woman of Bengal to obtain a master's degree in Bangla literature from the University of Dhaka. In 1941 she began her career as a lecturer in Lady Brabourne College in Kolkata. After the Partition of India in 1947, she migrated to Dhaka.

From 1960, she served as a professor of Bangla at Eden Girls' College for eight years and as principal of the Rajshahi Government Women's College for four years. Later, she served as the principal of Eden Girls' College.

Works
 Bedonar ei Baluchare (1963)
 Rupkathar Rajye (1963)
 Shes Praharer Alo (1969)
 Sagarika (1969)
 Bagurar Lokasahitya (1970)
 Ekti Sur Ekti Gan (1982)
 Bhindeshi Sera Galpa (1984)
 Amar Dirgha Bhraman (1985)
 Shatapuspa (3 vols) (1984, 1989 and 1990)

Awards
 President's Gold Medal (1967)
 Nurunnessa Khatun Vidyavinodini Medal (1977)
 Abdur Razzak Memorial Medal (1984)

References

1917 births
1990 deaths
University of Dhaka alumni
Bangladeshi writers
20th-century Bangladeshi women writers
20th-century Bangladeshi writers
Academic staff of Eden Mohila College
Indian educators
Indian emigrants to Pakistan
Pakistani educators